Oberea difformis is a species of beetle in the family Cerambycidae. It was described by Karl Jordan in 1894.

References

difformis
Beetles described in 1894